Stone Circles can be found in Hong Kong, as the area is rich in Neolithic and Bronze Age artifacts.

Lo Ah Tsai Stone Circle
Lo Ah Tsai Stone Circle was discovered in the northern part of Lamma Island by K M A Barnett, District Commissioner of the New Territories in 1956.

This stone circle was investigated by the Hong Kong University Archaeological Team in 1959, 1963 and 1982 respectively.

Fan Lau Stone Circle
Another stone circle was discovered at Fan Lau, on Lantau Island in 1980. This stone circle is a Declared monument in Hong Kong. The use of the stone circle is unknown, it was possibly used for rituals, or possibly not. It is assumed that it is a megalithic structure created during the late Neolithic (i.e. New Stone Age) and early Bronze Age.

Taipo Kau Stone Circle 
In 1953, a stone circle was discovered during the construction of a house. According to a research paper by David Devenish, the stone circle is about 9 feet in diameter, consisting of 9 or 10 stones which had been buried under a mound.

See also
 Prehistoric Hong Kong

References

Lamma Island
Fan Lau
Stone Age Asia
Archaeological sites in Hong Kong
Declared monuments of Hong Kong
Stone circles in Asia